Mika Johnson (born July 10, 1975) is a multimedia artist mainly known for his work with virtual reality,. His work combines dream-like narratives, mythos, ritual, and biodiversity.

Biography
Johnson was born in San Diego, California and graduated from Oberlin College in 2000.

Johnson's earlier works were mostly documentary and fiction films. This includes a 15 part web series "The Amerikans," which features three- to five-minute performative documentaries, and "Forever Professor": a 30-minute documentary on Mark McKinley, a college professor who amassed the world's largest collection of talking clocks. In July 2017, the film was released online.

In 2018, Johnson directed a virtual reality adaptation of Franz Kafka's The Metamorphosis produced by the Goethe Institut Prague, along with four short virtual documentaries featuring Reiner Stach, the author of a biography of Kafka.

Johnson's debut feature, Confessions of a Box Man (2020), which mixes documentary and fiction film techniques and stars Marek Zelinka, a Czech professional actor, dancer, and choreographer. The film also features a cameo appearance by American conductor David Woodard, premiered in Eastern Nigeria International Film Festival, in 2020, where Johnson won Best Director. The film was also nominated for Best Narrative Feature. Confessions of a Box Man went on to win the Best Film Award at the 11th Cinema Open film festival in Hradec Králové, in the Czech Republic.

In 2021, Johnson launched The Republic of Dreams, a hypothetical republic, based on the work of Polish author Bruno Schulz. Inspired by dreams and dreaming, the interactive website and project, which features music by Waclaw Zimpel and illustrations by Marta Lissowska, premiered in July 2021, at Dom Spotkań z Historią (DSH, History Meeting House), in Warsaw. The project's world premiere was launched in the Ukraine, at the Lviv Book Forum.

In March 2022, Johnson premiered his first large scale virtual reality installation, which included four VR pieces, all created in collaboration with High Road Stories. Titled The Infinite Library, the project, produced by Goethe Institut, is a traveling installation which reimagines the future of libraries as interactive spaces that engage visitors through
multisensory forms of storytelling. In addition to the VR pieces, the installation includes a QR code game, holograms, 3D-printed models in jars (called The Volumes), audiovisual works, and the project’s central piece: a vast VR library set in a cave. Within this virtual space, The Infinite Library hosts smaller sub-libraries (called The Realms), dedicated to Polynesian Navigation, South Indian Puppetry, and European Alchemy.

Music videos
Johnson has directed numerous music videos including one for the Sonja Vectomov song "Two in One", which features renowned prima ballerina Jana Andrsová.

References

Sources
 Hopkin, J.A. Kafkapanorama, The Times Literary Supplement, 2018.
 Forever Professor, The Monthly Film Festival, 2015.
 Barnett, D. Local Documentaries are Attracting a Global Audience, Ideastream, 2015.
 Johnson, M. Interior Worlds, Abitare, 2013.
 Love and Venom, Narratively, 2013.
 Gkiouzelis, D. Looking Through a Window Into Someone Else's World, Yatzer, 2013.
 Parker, M. How to Build a Really, Really Small House, Houzz, 2013.
 Buckley, L. Of Note, Oberlin Conservatory Magazine, 2013.
 Nagy, A. From the Heart of the Country, Oberlin Alumni Magazine, 2012.

External links
 "THE AMERIKANS" web series (February 2011-Present)
 Mika Johnson website
 

1975 births
Living people
Artists from Ohio
American people of Finnish descent
Oberlin College alumni
Film directors from California
Writers from San Diego